Pur (also Romanized as Pūr or Poor; also known as Pūr Aḩmadī) is a village in Kuh Shah Rural District, Ahmadi District, Hajjiabad County, Hormozgan Province, Iran. At the 2006 census, its population was 311, in 89 families.

References 

Populated places in Hajjiabad County